Yicheng County is a county in the prefecture-level city of Linfen, in the south of Shanxi Province, China.

Geography 
The county's elevation ranges from 473 to 1,556 meters in height.

Climate

Government

Administrative divisions 
Yicheng County has jurisdiction over 6 towns and 4 townships, which are further divided into 151 administrative villages. The county's government is seated in Tangxing.

County budget 
In 2019, the county government's fiscal revenue was 331.96 million yuan, of which, 211.66 million yuan came from tax revenue.

Demographics
As of 2019, the county's permanent population was 323,517, of which 137,500 were urban residents. In 2019, the county recorded a birth rate of 8.75 per 1,000, and a death rate of 5.9 per 1,000, resulting in a natural growth rate of 2.85 per 1,000.

Economy 
Yicheng reported a GDP of 7.14 billion yuan in 2019, a 4.1% increase from 2018, but relatively unchanged from its 2015 GDP of 7.07 billion yuan. Retail sales totaled 3.82 billion yuan the same year. The county has an average disposable income of 19,188 yuan, which is 32,404 yuan among urban residents and 12,796 yuan among rural residents.

Agriculture 
Yicheng County has 40,173 hectares of cropland, as of 2019, of which, 38,825 hectares were devoted to grain production, mostly corn and wheat, producing 186,701 tons of grain.

Industry 
Industrial enterprises in Yicheng County produced 3.531 million tons of raw coal, 344,000 tons of pig iron, and 36.21 million kWh of electricity in 2019. The county primarily relies on coal for electricity production, but other sources of power generation are becoming more prominent.

Transportation 
Houma–Yueshan Railway

References

 
County-level divisions of Shanxi